Lake City Public Library may refer to:

Lake City Public Library (Lake City, Iowa), designed by Edgar Lee Barber, listed on the National Register of Historic Places in Calhoun County, Iowa
Lake City Public Library, library of Lake City, Minnesota